Martino may refer to:

Places 
 Martino, Kardzhali Province, in Kardzhali Municipality, Bulgaria
 Martino, Phthiotis, a village in central Greece

People 

 Martino (given name)
Martin of Tours (316–397), one of a dozen saints bearing the name Martino in Italian
Martino da Como, 15th-century culinary maestro (born ca. 1430)
Pope Martin V (c. 1368–1431)
Al Martino (1927–2009), American singer
Bruno Martino (1925–2000), Italian composer, singer, and pianist
Donald Martino (1931–2005), American composer
Freddie Martino (born 1991), American football player
Gerardo Martino (born 1962), Argentine football manager
Kyle Martino (1981–), American footballer
Luciano Martino (1933–2013), Italian film producer, director and screenwriter
Miranda Martino (1933–), Italian singer and actress
Pat Martino (1944–2021), American jazz guitarist
Renato Martino (1932–), Italian Cardinal
Rinaldo Martino (1921–2000), Italian footballer
Rocco Martino, (born 1938), Italian involved in Niger uranium forgeries prior to the War in Iraq
Sergio Martino (1938–), Italian director and screenwriter
Steve Martino (1959–), American director

See also
Martin (name)
Martin (disambiguation)
Martini (disambiguation)
Martineau, a surname
San Martino (disambiguation)

Surnames from given names
Italian masculine given names
Italian-language surnames